Espoo United may refer to:
Espoo United (basketball)
Espoo United (ice hockey)